Sir William Edward Murray Tomlinson, 1st Baronet,  (4 August 1838 – 17 December 1912) was an English lawyer, colliery owner and Conservative politician.

Tomlinson was born at Heysham House in the Lancaster registration district in Lancashire and became a barrister. He was a twin, his twin sister Ellen died on 6 January 1919. He was living at 3 Richmond Terrace Richmond from 1868 until his death, although his gravestone suggests he returned to Heysham. He was part owner of the Worsley Mesnes Colliery Company.

Tomlinson was elected as Member of Parliament for  Preston in 1882, and held the seat until 1906. In the 1900 election he was challenged unsuccessfully by Keir Hardie. It was announced that he would receive a baronetcy in the 1902 Coronation Honours list published on 26 June 1902 for the (subsequently postponed) coronation of King Edward VII, and on 24 July 1902 he was created a Baronet, of Richmond terrace, Whitehall, in the city of Westminster, in the county of London. At the end of March, 1903, Tomlinson was appointed a deputy lieutenant of Lancashire.

Winston Churchill was challenged to fisticuffs when he referred to Tomlinson as "a miserable old man".

Tomlinson never married and on his death at the age of 74 the baronetcy became extinct.

References

External links
 
 Includes picture

1838 births
1912 deaths
Baronets in the Baronetage of the United Kingdom
Conservative Party (UK) MPs for English constituencies
Deputy Lieutenants of Lancashire
UK MPs 1880–1885
UK MPs 1885–1886
UK MPs 1886–1892
UK MPs 1892–1895
UK MPs 1895–1900
UK MPs 1900–1906
English barristers
Politics of Preston